CYG or Cyg or variant, may refer to:
 Cygnus (constellation) abbreviation
 Commonwealth Youth Games
 Corryong Airport IATA airport code